Wee Boon Teck (1850–1888) was the only son of Wee Bin and was the latter's successor at the firm of Wee Bin & Co., where he improved and strengthened the position of the firm. He served on the committees of Tan Tock Seng Hospital and Po Leung Kuk. He donated $4,000 to the Tan Tock Seng Hospital, which was invested by Government for about twenty years and which was then applied towards the cost of building a ward bearing his name in the Hospital at Moulmein Road. He was described as having a kindly and charitable disposition. Wee Boon Teck died on 22 September 1888 at the age of 38. Boon Teck Road is named after him.

References

Further reading
Singapore: days of old By Illustrated Magazine Publishing Co. (Hong Kong) "A special commemorative history of Singapore published on the 10th Anniversary of Singapore Tatler." published by Illustrated Magazine Publishing Co.,Ltd., 1992, 9789627093190
Home port Singapore: a history of Straits Steamship Company Limited, 1890-1965 - Page 65 - by K. G. Tregonning - Business & Economics - 1967
Lloyd's register of British and foreign shipping By Lloyd's Register of British and Foreign Shipping (Firm)  published by Cox and Wyman, printers, 1878
Opium and empire: Chinese society in Colonial Singapore, 1800-1910 By Carl A. Trocki
One Hundred Years of Singapore: Being Some Account of the Capital of the Straits Settlements from Its Foundation by Sir Stamford Raffles on 6 February 1819 to 6 February 1919, Gilbert Edward Brooke, Volume 1 of One Hundred Years of Singapore, Walter Makepeace, Authors: Walter Makepeace, Gilbert Edward Brooke, Roland St. John Braddell, Edited by Walter Makepeace, Gilbert Edward Brooke, Roland St. John Braddell, Published by J. Murray, 1921
The directory & chronicle of China, Japan, Straits Settlements, Malaya, Borneo, Siam, the Philippines, Korea, Indo-China, Netherlands Indies, etc. Published 1892
Tan Tock Seng, pioneer: his life, times, contributions, and legacy By Kamala Devi Dhoraisingam, Dhoraisingam S. Samuel
Singapore, then & now by Ray K. Tyers - Singapore - 1976
The Nautical Magazine, Volumes 163-164 Published 1950
A gallery of Chinese kapitans by Choon San Wong - 1963 Page 31

1888 deaths
Singaporean businesspeople
1850 births